George Lane-Fox may refer to:

George Lane-Fox (MP) (1793–1848), English landowner and Tory MP
George Lane-Fox (1816–1896), English landowner, High Sheriff of Leitrim and High Sheriff of Yorkshire, son of the above
George Lane-Fox, 1st Baron Bingley (1870–1947), English Conservative politician, grandson of the above

See also
George Lane (disambiguation)
George Fox (disambiguation)